Amphitorna brunhyala is a moth in the family Drepanidae. It was described by Shen and Chen in 1990. It is found in China (Guangdong and Fujian).

References

Moths described in 1990
Drepaninae
Moths of Asia